Dauphin of France (also), originally Dauphin of Viennois (Dauphin de Viennois), was the title given to the heir apparent to the throne of France from 1350 to 1791, and from 1824 to 1830. The word dauphin is French for dolphin and was the hereditary title of the ruler of the Dauphiné of Viennois. While early heirs were granted these lands to rule, eventually only the title was granted.

History

Guigues IV, Count of Vienne, had a dolphin on his coat of arms and was nicknamed le Dauphin. The title of Dauphin de Viennois descended in his family until 1349, when Humbert II sold his seigneury, called the Dauphiné, to King Philippe VI on condition that the heir of France assume the title of le Dauphin. The wife of the Dauphin was known as la Dauphine.

The first French prince called le Dauphin was Charles the Wise, later ascending to the throne as Charles V of France. The title was roughly equivalent to the English (thence British) Prince of Wales, the Scottish Duke of Rothesay, the Portuguese Prince of Brazil, and the Spanish Prince of Asturias. The official style of a Dauphin of France, prior to 1461, was par la grâce de Dieu, dauphin de Viennois, comte de Valentinois et de Diois ("By the Grace of God, Dauphin of Viennois, Count of Valentinois and of Diois"). A Dauphin of France united the coat of arms of the Dauphiné, which featured dolphins, with the French fleurs-de-lis, and might, where appropriate, further unite that with other arms (e.g. Francis, son of Francis I, was ruling Duke of Brittany, so united the arms of that province with the typical arms of a Dauphin; Francis II, while Dauphin, was also King of Scots by marriage to Mary I, and added the arms of the Kingdom of Scotland to those of the Dauphin).

Originally the Dauphin was personally responsible for the rule of the Dauphiné, which was legally part of the Holy Roman Empire, and which the Emperors, in giving the rule of the province to the French heirs, had stipulated must never be united with France. Because of this, the Dauphiné suffered from anarchy in the 14th and 15th centuries, since the Dauphins were frequently minors or concerned with other matters.

During his period as Dauphin, Louis, son of Charles VII, defied his father by remaining in the province longer than the king permitted and by engaging in personal politics more beneficial to the Dauphiné than to France. For example, he married Charlotte of Savoy against his father's wishes. Savoy was a traditional ally of the Dauphiné, and Louis wished to reaffirm that alliance to stamp out rebels and robbers in the province. Louis was driven out of the Dauphiné by Charles VII's soldiers in 1456, leaving the region to fall back into disorder. After his succession as Louis XI of France in 1461, Louis united the Dauphiné with France, bringing it under royal control.

The title was automatically conferred upon the next heir apparent to the throne in the direct line upon birth, accession of the parent to the throne or death of the previous Dauphin, unlike the British title Prince of Wales, which has always been in the gift of the monarch (traditionally conferred upon the heir's 21st birthday).

The sons of the King of France held the style and rank of fils de France (son of France), while male-line grandsons were given the style and rank of petits-enfants de France (Grandson of France). The sons and grandsons of the Dauphin ranked higher than their cousins, being treated as the king's children and grandchildren respectively. The sons of the Dauphin, though grandsons of the king, were ranked as Sons of France, and the grandsons of the Dauphin ranked as Grandsons of France; other great-grandsons of the king ranked merely as princes of the blood.

The title was abolished by the Constitution of 1791, which made France a constitutional monarchy. Under the constitution the heir-apparent to the throne (Dauphin Louis-Charles at that time) was restyled Prince Royal (a Prince of the Blood retitled prince français), taking effect from the inception of the Legislative Assembly on 1 October 1791. The title was restored in potentia under the Bourbon Restoration of Louis XVIII, but there would not be another Dauphin until after his death. With the accession of his brother Charles X, Charles' son and heir Louis-Antoine, Duke of Angoulême automatically became Dauphin.

With the removal of the Bourbons the title fell into disuse, the heirs of Louis-Philippe being titled Prince Royal. After the death of Henri, comte de Chambord, Carlos, Duke of Madrid, the heir of the legitimist claimant, Juan, Count of Montizón, made use of the title in pretense, as have the Spanish legitimist claimants since.

Gallery of Arms

List of Dauphins

In literature

In Mark Twain's Adventures of Huckleberry Finn, Huck encounters two odd characters who turn out to be professional con men. One of them claims that he should be treated with deference, since he is "really" an impoverished English duke, and the other, not to be outdone, reveals that he is "really" the Dauphin ("Looey the Seventeen, son of Looey the Sixteen and Marry Antonet").

Louis, Duke of Guyenne, the Dauphin of Viennois, is a character in Shakespeare's Henry V.

In Baronness Emma Orczy's Eldorado, the Scarlet Pimpernel rescues the Dauphin from prison and helps spirit him from France.

Alphonse Daudet wrote a short story called "The Death of the Dauphin", about a young Dauphin who wants to stop Death from approaching him.

The Dauphin is also mentioned in Cormac McCarthy's Blood Meridian.

"The Dauphin" is a 1988 episode of Star Trek: The Next Generation. As the titular character is female, the episode title gets the gender incorrect (the French female equivalent is "Dauphine").

Robert Pattinson portrays the Dauphin of Viennois in The King (2019 film).

See also
 Dauphine of France
 List of heirs to the French throne
 Prince of Wales
 Prince of Asturias
 Prince of Beira
 Duke of Braganza
 Crown prince
 Tsarevich
 Dauphins of Viennois
 Dauphins of Auvergne
 King of Rome
 Madame Royale
 Monsieur
 Madame
 Fils de France
 Petit-Fils de France
 Prince du Sang
 Prince of Tarnovo

References

 
 
France
Royal titles
French monarchy